Fogliano may refer to:

Fogliano, Cascia, a village in the province of Perugia, Italy
Fogliano, Reggio Emilia, a village in Reggio Emilia, Italy
Fogliano, Siena, a village in the province of Siena, Italy
Fogliano Redipuglia, a municipality in Friuli-Venezia Giulia, Italy